Gerlinde Doberschütz ( Mey; born 26 October 1964, in Meiningen) is a German rower.
Her brother-in-law Jens Doberschütz was also a successful rower. Doberschütz was trained by Herta Weissig.

References 

 

1964 births
Living people
People from Meiningen
People from Bezirk Suhl
East German female rowers
Sportspeople from Thuringia
Olympic rowers of Germany
Rowers at the 1988 Summer Olympics
Olympic gold medalists for East Germany
Olympic medalists in rowing
Medalists at the 1988 Summer Olympics
World Rowing Championships medalists for East Germany
Recipients of the Patriotic Order of Merit in gold